Obturator may refer to:

Medicine

Anatomical structures
 Obturator foramen
 Obturator fascia
 Obturator canal
 Obturator vessels (disambiguation)
 Obturator artery
 Obturator veins
 Obturator nerve
 Anterior branch of obturator nerve
 Posterior branch of obturator nerve
 Cutaneous branch of the obturator nerve
 Obturator internus nerve
 Accessory obturator nerve
 Obturator membrane
 Obturator crest
 Obturator muscles (disambiguation)
 Obturator internus muscle
 Obturator externus muscle
 Obturator externus groove
 Obturator process (in archosaurs)

Diseases and disorders
 Obturator hernia

Medical procedures
 Obturator sign

Medical devices
 Part of a trocar device
 A device used as a guide during tracheostomy tube insertion
 Palatal obturator, a dental prosthesis used to seal an opening in the palate, i.e. cleft palate

Botany
 Part of the ovary of a flower that chemically guides the pollen tube to the micropyle

Engineering
 Obturator ring, a part in early aircraft engines
 Obturating ring, used particularly in artillery to form a seal when pressure is applied